Paskuqan is a city and a former municipality in the Tirana County, central Albania. At the 2015 local government reform it became a subdivision of the municipality Kamëz. The population at the 2011 census was 37,349.

References

Former municipalities in Tirana County
Administrative units of Kamëz
Cities in Albania